IF Elfsborg had another season where they stayed in the top four for the fifth consecutive season. Being tipped for title glory, Elfsborg was nowhere near such a feat, but thanks to Denni Avdić and his sensational season, scoring 19 league goals a European qualification was granted once more. In the 2010-11 edition of UEFA Europa League.

Squad

Goalkeepers
  Ante Čović
  Jesper Christiansen
  Joakim Wulff

Defenders
  Mathias Florén
  Johan Sjöberg
  Johan Karlsson
  Martin Andersson
  Jon Jönsson
  Anders Wikström
  Teddy Lučić

Midfielders
  Jari Ilola
  Anders Svensson
  Martin Ericsson
  Daniel Mobaeck
  Daniel Nordmark
  Johan Larsson
  Niklas Hult
  Stefan Ishizaki
  Elmin Kurbegović

Attackers
  Denni Avdić
  Amadou Jawo
  James Keene
  Fredrik Berglund

Allsvenskan

Matches

 Gefle-Elfsborg 0-0
 Elfsborg-Halmstad 6-0
 1-0 Johan Larsson 
 2-0 Johan Larsson 
 3-0 James Keene 
 4-0 James Keene 
 5-0 Fredrik Berglund 
 6-0 Denni Avdić 
 Kalmar FF-Elfsborg 2-2
 1-0 Ricardo Santos 
 1-1 Daniel Mobaeck 
 1-2 Daniel Nordmark 
 2-2 Ricardo Santos 
 Elfsborg-Häcken 0-0
 Helsingborg-Elfsborg 2-1
 1-0 Ardian Gashi 
 1-1 Denni Avdić 
 2-1 Marcus Holgersson 
 Elfsborg-Djurgården 3-1
 0-1 Johan Oremo 
 1-1 Denni Avdić 
 2-1 Denni Avdić 
 3-1 Martin Ericsson 
 IFK Göteborg-Elfsborg 5-1
 0-1 Martin Ericsson 
 1-1 Sebastian Eriksson 
 2-1 Hjálmar Jónsson 
 3-1 Jakob Johansson 
 4-1 Jakob Johansson 
 5-1 Robin Söder 
 Elfsborg-Trelleborg 4-1
 0-1 Joakim Sjöhage 
 1-1 Emir Bajrami 
 2-1 Denni Avdić 
 3-1 Denni Avdić 
 4-1 Johan Larsson 
 Elfsborg-Brommapojkarna 1-0
 1-0 Johan Larsson 
 Åtvidaberg-Elfsborg 1-1
 1-0 Haris Radetinač 
 1-1 Denni Avdić 
 Elfsborg-Malmö FF 2-2
 0-1 Jimmy Durmaz 
 0-2 Wílton Figueiredo 
 1-2 Denni Avdić 
 2-2 Denni Avdić 
 Mjällby-Elfsborg 2-0
 1-0 Tobias Grahn 
 2-0 David Löfquist 
 Elfsborg-AIK 4-0
 1-0 Denni Avdić 
 2-0 Martin Ericsson 
 3-0 Denni Avdić 
 4-0 Amadou Jawo 
 GAIS-Elfsborg 0-2
 0-1 Emir Bajrami 
 0-2 Denni Avdić 
 Elfsborg-Örebro 3-3
 0-1 Patrik Anttonen 
 1-1 Martin Ericsson 
 2-1 Denni Avdić 
 2-2 Roni Porokara 
 3-2 Stefan Ishizaki 
 3-3 Astrit Ajdarević 
 Örebro-Elfsborg 3-0
 1-0 Astrit Ajdarević 
 2-0 Astrit Ajdarević 
 3-0 Samuel Wowoah 
 Elfsborg-Gefle 1-0
 1-0 Stefan Ishizaki 
 Halmstad-Elfsborg 1-3
 0-1 Stefan Ishizaki 
 0-2 Denni Avdić 
 0-3 Denni Avdić 
 1-3 Emir Kujović 
 Elfsborg-Kalmar FF 4-1
 1-0 Mathias Florén 
 1-1 Ricardo Santos 
 2-1 Johan Larsson 
 3-1 Denni Avdić 
 4-1 James Keene 
 Häcken-Elfsborg 1-1
 1-0 Jonas Henriksson 
 1-1 Denni Avdić 
 Malmö FF-Elfsborg 1-0
 1-0 Daniel Andersson 
 Elfsborg-Mjällby 2-0
 1-0 Martin Ericsson 
 2-0 Daniel Nordmark 
 Trelleborg-Elfsborg 1-1
 1-0 Kristian Haynes 
 1-1 Denni Avdić 
 Elfsborg-IFK Göteborg 1-1
 0-1 Tobias Hysén 
 1-1 Jon Jönsson 
 Brommapojkarna-Elfsborg 2-2
 0-1 Jon Jönsson 
 1-1 Sinan Ayrancı 
 2-1 Pontus Segerström 
 2-2 Niklas Hult 
 Elfsborg-Åtvidaberg 4-1
 0-1 Haris Radetinač 
 1-1 Stefan Ishizaki 
 2-1 Stefan Ishizaki 
 3-1 Johan Larsson 
 4-1 James Keene 
 Elfsborg-Helsingborg 1-3
 0-1 May Mahlangu 
 1-1 Mathias Florén 
 1-2 Erik Sundin 
 1-3 Erik Sundin 
 Djurgården-Elfsborg 4-4
 1-0 Prince Ikpe Ekong 
 1-1 Prince Ikpe Ekong 
 1-2 Stefan Ishizaki 
 2-2 Kennedy Igboananike 
 2-3 Amadou Jawo 
 3-3 Petter Gustafsson 
 3-4 Denni Avdić 
 4-4 Kennedy Igboananike 
 AIK-Elfsborg 2-0
 1-0 Mohamed Bangura 
 2-0 Viktor Lundberg 
 Elfsborg-GAIS 1-0
 1-0 Martin Andersson 

IF Elfsborg seasons
Elfsborg